In molecular biology, the type IV collagen C4 domain (or collagen IV NC1 domain) is a duplicated domain present at the C-terminus of type IV collagens. Each type IV collagen contains a long triple-helical collagenous domain flanked by a short 7S domain of 25 amino acids and a globular non-collagenous C4 domain of ~230 amino acids at the N and C terminus, respectively. In protomer assembly, the C4 domains of three chains interact, forming a C4 trimer, to select and register chains for triple helix formation. In network assembly, the C4 trimers of two protomers interact, forming a C4 hexamer structure, to select and connect protomers.

The collagen IV C4 domain contains 12 cysteines, and all of them are involved in disulphide bonds. It folds into a tertiary structure with predominantly beta-strands. The collagen IV C4 domain is composed of two similarly folded subdomains stabilised by 3 intrachain disulphide bonds involving the following pairs: C1-C6, C2-C5, and C3-C4. Each subdomain represents a compact disulphide-stabilised triangular structure, from which a finger-like hairpin loop projects into an incompletely formed six-stranded beta-sheet of an adjacent subdomain of the same or of an adjacent chain clamping the subdomains tightly together.

References

Protein domains